A hospital museum is generally a former hospital turned into a museum, often a medical museum.

List
Bakırköy Psychiatric Hospital Museum
Complex of Sultan Bayezid II Health Museum
Old DeLand Memorial Hospital
Diamantina Health Care Museum
Foundling Museum
Franja Partisan Hospital
Glenside Museum
Hohlgangsanlage 8
Hospital in the Rock
Long Island Psychiatric Museum
Museum of Medical Humanities
Museum of the Castle and Military Hospital at Ujazdów
Porirua Lunatic Asylum
Spanish Military Hospital Museum
Springsure Hospital Museum
St Bartholomew's Hospital
St George's Church, Bergen
Tung Wah Group of Hospitals Museum